The 75 mm Field Gun M1897 on M2 Carriage was a field gun and anti-tank gun which was used by the US Army during the interwar period and World War II.

History 
When the United States entered World War I on the side of the Allied Powers in 1917, it lacked sufficient arms to supply its rapidly expanding armed forces.  Although the United States had been providing arms and supplies to the Allies, few of these weapons were being used to arm US forces.  The few weapons that the US Army did have were often of a different caliber than British or French weapons, thus using incompatible ammunition. When the United States entered the war, the Allies had an adequate supply of arms but they were running short of manpower; since the United States had more manpower than weapons, the Allies decided it made logistical sense to use British- and French-supplied weapons to arm American forces to bring them rapidly into action rather than wait for the country's industry to catch up with its armed forces.

Design 
Originally of French design, the Canon de 75 modèle 1897 was supplied to the United States in large numbers and became the standard field gun for the US Army during World War I. The mle 1897 was a revolutionary breech-loading artillery piece that combined a Nordenfelt eccentric screw breech, fixed "quickfire" ammunition, and a hydro-pneumatic recoil mechanism. The combination of fixed ammunition, recoil mechanism, and simple breech made the mle 1897 one of the fastest-firing and most accurate field guns of its era. It had a box trail carriage with a gun shield, and two wooden-spoked steel-rimmed wheels on an unsprung axle, designed for horse traction.

World War I 
In US service the mle 1897 was given the designation 75 mm Gun M1897. There were 480 American 75 mm field gun batteries (over 1,900 guns) on the battlefields of France in November 1918. American industry began building the mle 1897 in the spring of 1918, but only 143 American-built guns had been shipped to France by 11 November 1918, and most American batteries used French-built 75s.

Between World Wars 
Although World War I had shown that direct fire, light field guns like the mle 1897 lacked adequate firepower to destroy an entrenched enemy, the majority of combatants had large numbers of them and had little impetus to replace them. With a limited peacetime budget, the US Army, like other armies, opted to modernize its existing medium artillery. From 1920 to 1925, the Ordnance Department modified the M1897 gun by placing it on a new carriage designed to address the shortcomings of the box trail carriage that included limited traverse, limited elevation, and limited range. The new weapon was standardized in 1926 as the "75 mm Gun M1 on Carriage M2A1." Only one battery's worth of these weapons were completed before the project stopped because of lack of funding.

The new M2A1 carriage had a sprung axle with steel disc wheels and pneumatic tires, a new gun shield, and an integrated jack. In 1932, it was accepted for small-scale production. The barrels came from 2,000 unconverted M1897s that were in storage. The conversion to the M2A1 carriages added . The increased elevation allowed the modernized guns to be used for both direct and indirect fire roles because of greater range ( vs ) and greater muzzle velocity ( vs ).

Modernization of field artillery
In 1932, a modified gun known as the M2 was standardized for limited production. It took advantage of new projectiles and developments in high explosives. In the early 1930s, the U.S. Army Chief of Staff, General Douglas MacArthur, ordered the motorization of half of the Army's light field artillery. To achieve this, existing box trail 75 mm gun carriages were given sprung axles, steel wheels, and pneumatic tires to allow them to be towed behind vehicles at higher speeds. On January 18, 1934, the conversion kit for existing guns was standardized, and modernized guns were given the designations "75 mm Field Gun M1897A1," "75 mm Field Gun M1897A2," "75 mm Field Gun M1897A3," and "75 mm Field Gun M1897A4." The M1897A2 had an autofretted barrel, no barrel jacket, and 156° vs 120° breech mechanism. The M1897A3 and M1897A4 were similar to the M1897A2, except the M1897A4 had the muzzle guides removed and replaced by steel rails with bronze strips. The modifications added  of weight, but performance remained the same.

In 1934, the first conversion kits were issued to fourteen National Guard field artillery regiments. By October 1941, 871 conversions had been authorized but only 605 guns had been completed. Modernization of 75 mm guns also involved placing M1897 guns on new M2A1 carriages. Production of the M2A2 carriage began in 1936, but the conversion process was slow, and by the end of 1939 only 200 were converted. In 1940, a simplified and improved carriage with retractable crescent-shaped jacks known as the M2A3 was introduced.

By 1940, the War Department had modernized 56 of its 81 75 mm gun battalions in the Regular Army and National Guard with these two conversions. These guns were used extensively for training and pre-war exercises. However, none are believed to have been used in combat by US forces during World War II.

World War II 
After the defeat of France in the spring of 1940, the U.S. Army became worried about its lack of modern antitank guns. In July 1940, a simplified and improved carriage with retractable crescent-shaped jacks known as the M2A3 was introduced, and it was decided to mount M1897 guns on both M2A2 and M2A3 carriages and equip them with direct-fire sights so they could be used as anti-tank guns. 918 M2A3 carriages had been manufactured by November 1941, and a report that month stated that 554 M2A2 and 188 M2A3 carriages were in service; because of the shortage of modern artillery pieces, these guns were issued to both field artillery and anti-tank units.

In 1941, field artillery units began converting to the new 105 mm M2 Howitzer, and some M1897s were removed from their towed carriages and installed on the half-track M3 Gun Motor Carriage (GMC). The towed version and the M3 GMC was used by American Tank Destroyer battalions during operations in the North African and Italian campaigns.  M3 GMCs were also used in the Pacific theater during the Philippines campaign and by Marine Regimental Weapons Companies until 1944. Their performance in an anti-tank role was adequate against Japanese and Italian armor but inadequate against late war German armor. M3 GMCs remained in use with the British in Italy and North West Europe in small numbers until the end of the war. Towed guns were also used for training and on March 8, 1945, they were declared obsolete and retired.

Ammunition 
The M1897 guns used the same 75×350 mm R ammunition as the 75 mm Gun M2/M3/M6 tank guns of the M3 Lee, M4 Sherman, M24 Chaffee, and B-25 Mitchell. The M2 was a L/31 gun, the M1897 was L/36, and the M3 was L/40. Armor penetration statistics are approximate and based on M3 data.

See also 
 Canon de 75 modèle 1897 modifié 1938 - A mle 1897 modernized for motor traction.
 7.5 cm Pak 97/38 - A German modification of mle 1897 barrels on Pak 38 carriages.
 76 mm divisional gun M1902/30 - A field gun modernized for motor traction.
 QF 18-pounder gun - A field gun modernized for motor traction.

Gallery

References

External links

 75-MM Gun Materiel, M1897 and Modifications. - DTIC

75 mm artillery
World War II artillery of the United States
Artillery of the United States
Anti-tank guns of the United States